C. J. Mosley may refer to:
C. J. Mosley (defensive lineman) (born 1983), American football defensive lineman
C. J. Mosley (linebacker) (born 1992), American football linebacker

See also
Mosley (surname)